Trump Park Avenue is a residential building on the southern border of Lenox Hill at 502 Park Avenue in Manhattan, New York City. The 32-story building, designed by Goldner and Goldner in 1929, today contains 120 luxury condominium apartments and 8 penthouses converted by real estate developer Donald Trump.

The structure was built as a skyscraper hotel. Originally named the Viceroy Hotel, it was renamed the Cromwell Arms, then the Hotel Delmonico.  It was purchased in 1929 by New York investor Benjamin Winter, Sr.

On August 28, 1964, Bob Dylan met The Beatles and Brian Epstein for the first time in their suite on the sixth floor where he introduced them to cannabis. 200,000 incoming calls were received by the hotel switchboard during their two-day stay. Fans stood eight-deep outside, held back by barricades, and the lobby and corridors were patrolled by police officers.

The building was converted into apartments in 1974. In 1977, Christie’s leased the Hotel Delmonico’s grand ballroom on the second floor as its first international auction house. In 1990, real estate investor Sarah Korein converted it back to a hotel. Trump purchased the hotel from Korein's estate in 2001 for $115 million and hired architect Costas Kondylis to renovate it.

From 1976 to the early 1990s, the current New York Sports Club’s ground floor location was home to Regine's, a restaurant lounge where many celebrities would meet before going to Studio 54. Andy Warhol was a regular. The building is also home to many of New York's finest established businesses, including Scully & Scully, that has occupied a storefront in the building since 1934.

In 2011, Trump allegedly increased the rent of an apartment to $100,000 per month in order to keep Arianna Huffington out of the building. In 2019, the Trump Organization sued Prince Faisal bin Abdul Majeed al-Saud for $1.8 million in back rent.

Notable residents

 Lucille Ball
 Angela Chen
 Michael Cohen
 Donny Deutsch
 Lorenz Hart
 Eric Kuhn
 Jared Kushner
 Matt Lauer
 Rupert Murdoch
 Wendi Deng Murdoch
 Stewart Rahr
 Alexander Rodriguez ("A-Rod")
 Ronnie Spector
 Ed Sullivan
 Thomas Tighe
 Jonathan Tisch
 Steve Tisch
 Ivanka Trump
 Paula White
 Randy White
 Charles Seymour Whitman

References

External links 

1929 establishments in New York City
Residential skyscrapers in Manhattan
Upper East Side
Park Avenue
59th Street (Manhattan)